Caballeronia sordidicola is a species of bacteria which has been reported to perform biological nitrogen fixation and promote plant growth

References 

Burkholderiaceae
Bacteria described in 2003